Naraparaju Ramchander Rao (born 27 April 1959) is an Indian politician and advocate from Telangana. He is a member of Bharatiya Janata Party National Executive member, President for BJP's Hyderabad unit and a member of Bar Council of India. He served as the Member of Telangana Legislative Council (MLC) for Hyderabad, Ranga Reddy and Mahabubnagar Graduates' Constituency from 2015 to 2021. He is also on the General Council of NALSAR University of Law.

Ramchander Rao started his legal practice in Hyderabad in 1985. In 2014, he was elected as a member of the Bar Council of India.  He has also been BJP's Chief Spokesperson and the General Secretary of undivided Andhra Pradesh State.

Family 

Ramchander Rao's father, Professor NVRLN Rao, was Dean of the Faculty of Engineering for Osmania University. One of his brothers, N V Ramana Rao, is Director at National Institute of Technology, Warangal, Hyderabad. His sister Dr. Padmavathi is a gynaecologist.

Rao was married to Savithri who died in February 2017 from prolonged illness. They have a daughter Amuktha Naraparaju working in Australia and son Avaneesh Naraparaju is a High court lawyer.

Early life
Rao took to politics while at Picket Kendriya Vidyalaya school during the period of the Emergency. For three consecutive years, he was elected President of the Students' Union (affiliated to Akhil Bharatiya Vidyarthi Parishad, (ABVP)) while studying Bachelor of Arts at Railway Degree College. For two terms, he was elected as secretary (ABVP) of Osmania Law College Student Union. He was jailed 14 times during his student years.

He attended high school in 1977 at Kendriya Vidyalaya in Picket Secunderabad. His BA came from Railway Degree College Secunderabad in 1980. He secured a Master of Arts (Political Science) from Osmania University in 1982, standing second in the examinations. He earned an LLB from Osmania University in 1985.

Publications
He writes a column on Sundays named "Legal Corner" in Andhra Jyothy.
He contributes legal articles to law journals such as Andhra Legal Digest and Andhra Pradesh Legal Journal.
He has contributed articles to Jana Sandesh
He has also written many books, the most recent one was on his debates and discussions in the Telangana Legislative Council.

Positions 
 1977-80—President of Students Union, Railway Degree College 
 1982-85— Secretary of Students Union, Osmania University
 1st State secretary for the Bharatiya Janata Yuva Morcha
 Legal Cell Convener for AP state BJP Unit.
 Joint convener for National Legal Cell 
 2008- —State spokesperson for Bharatiya Janata Party, first for undivided Andhra Pradesh and then for Mahabubnagar
 2011-2013—Andhra Pradesh State General secretary.
 2014 - Member, Bar Council of India
 2015 - MLC, Telangana for Rangareddy, Mahabubnagar & Hyderabad
 2017- President, BJP Hyderabad

Legislature
Rao lost the 2009 election for Member of Legislative Council (MLC) for the Graduates’ constituency for Hyderabad, Ranga Reddy and Mahabubnagar districts.
He contested in 2014 from Malkajgiri, for Member of Legislative Assembly and lost by a narrow margin. In 2015, he won as Member of Legislative Council (MLC) from Mahabubnagar, Ranga Reddy, Hyderabad Graduates Constituency in Telangana as a BJP candidate. Rao lost to Surabhi Vani Devi in 2021 Mahabubnagar-Rangareddy-Hyderabad Graduates’ constituency elections.

References

1959 births
Living people
Telangana politicians
Bharatiya Janata Party politicians from Telangana
Members of the Telangana Legislative Council
People from Hyderabad, India